State Route 28 (SR 28) is a state highway in the state of Tennessee, traversing the state in a north–south axis from south of Jasper to the Kentucky state line at Static.

Route description

Marion County

SR 28 begins just south of Jasper at an interchange with I-24/SR 27 (Exit 155) in Marion County. It then goes north as a 4-lane divided highway to have an interchange with US 41/US 64/US 72/SR 2, where it becomes concurrent with US 41, in Jasper before bypassing downtown to the east and continuing north and narrowing to a 2-lane. Between both of the aforementioned interchanges, SR 28 has an unsigned concurrency with SR 27. The highway then has an intersection with unsigned SR 150, where US 41 splits off, before leaving Jasper and continuing north. It then travels up the Sequatchie Valley, parallel to the Sequatchie River, and passes through Sequatchie, where it crosses the Little Sequatchie River, before entering Whitwell at an intersection with SR 283. It then has an intersection with SR 108 before going through downtown and leaving Whitwell to go down a long, narrow valley full of farmland. SR 28 then crosses into Sequatchie County.

Sequatchie County

SR 28 then goes north to leave the Sequatchie River before it enters Dunlap and has a y-intersection with US 127/SR 8. From this point on, SR 28 is the unsigned companion route of US 127 from Dunlap to the state line at Static. US 127/SR 8/SR 28 then go north through downtown to an interchange with SR 111, with SR 8 splitting off here to go west on SR 111. US 127/SR 28 then go through some farmland before entering Bledsoe County.

Bledsoe County

The highway now passes through Palio, Lusk, and Lees Station before entering Pikeville at an intersection with SR 30. They then become concurrent with each other to bypass downtown as a 4-Lane undivided highway before splitting off to the west, with US 127/SR 28 narrowing back to 2-lanes and continuing north through farmland to pass through Cold Spring and Melvine before pulling away from the Sequatchie River and ascending onto the Cumberland Plateau and entering Cumberland County.

Cumberland County

US 127/SR 28 immediately have an intersection with Vandever Road, which is a connector to SR 282 and Lake Tansi Village. They then go through more farmland before passing by Cumberland Mountain State Park and having an intersection with SR 419. The highway now passes through Cumberland Homesteads, where it has a y-intersection with SR 68, and US 127/SR 28 turn northeast to enter Crossville. US 127/SR 28 intersect SR 392 (a beltway around downtown) before entering downtown and having an intersection with US 70/SR 1/SR 101. They then pass through downtown before widening to a 4-lane and junctioning with SR 298. US 127/SR 28 then have an intersection with US 70N/SR 24 before going through Crossville's main business district before crossing the Obed River and coming to an interchange with I-40 (Exit 317). US 127/SR 28 then leave Crossville, narrowing to 2-lanes, and continue north through more farmland. They then cross into Fentress County via a couple of sharp switchbacks, in order to negotiate a bridge over Clear Creek.

Fentress County

US 127/SR 28 then go through more farmland before entering Clarkrange to have an intersection with SR 62. US 127/SR 28 then passes through Clarkrange before having an intersection with SR 85 and entering Grimsley. They then pass through Grimsley before widening to a 4-lane to pass by Jamestown Municipal Airport and intersect SR 296 west of Allardt. They then enter Jamestown and bypass downtown (beginning with the intersection with Main Street (Old US 127/SR 28) to the east and have an interchange with SR 52 before having one with SR 154. They then leave Jamestown, at the other end of Main Street (Old US 127/SR 28), and continue north and narrowing to a 2-lane. They then pass through Sgt. Alvin C. York State Historic Park and Pall Mall, where the highway crosses the Wolf River and has an intersection with Caney Creek Road (connector to Kentucky Route 200), before crossing into Pickett County.

Pickett County

The highway winds it way through rural areas for several miles to intersect with SR 325, and then SR 295, before entering Static and intersecting both Kentucky Route 1076 and SR 111 immediately before crossing the state line into Kentucky, with SR 28 ending here and US 127 continuing into Kentucky.

History
In December 2021, SR 28's course from Jasper to Crossville was designated the Sequatchie Valley Scenic Byway, part of the National Scenic Byway system.

Major intersections

References 

028
028
028
Transportation in Bledsoe County, Tennessee
Transportation in Cumberland County, Tennessee
Transportation in Fentress County, Tennessee
Transportation in Pickett County, Tennessee